"Tomorrow" is the third single by Los Angeles-based band Sixx:A.M. It reached #33 on the U.S. Hot Mainstream Rock Tracks, not quite matching the #29 success of the previous single, "Pray for Me". This song is also featured in the soundtrack to the film Saw IV.

Track listing

References

2008 singles
Songs written by DJ Ashba
Songs written by Nikki Sixx
Songs written by James Michael
Sixx:A.M. songs
Songs written by Scott Stevens (singer)
2007 songs
Eleven Seven Label Group singles